Slatter is a surname. Notable people with the surname include:

Angela Slatter, Australian writer
Charlie Slatter, Nobel Peace Prize Winner
Heber Slatter, British footballer (1887–1918)
Helen Slatter, British swimmer
Kate Slatter, Australian rower
Leonard Slatter, British / South African air marshal
Les Slatter (born 1931), English professional footballer
Neil Slatter, Welsh footballer
Tim Slatter, rugby league footballer of the 1980s